Paweł Działyński (born 1560 – died 1609) of Ogończyk coat of arms, was a Polish courtier, royal secretary, ambassador and governor of Bobrowniki and Radziejów.

Inspiration 
It is possible that the character Polonius from Shakespeare's Hamlet was inspired by Działyński.

The Haags Historisch Museum (Historical Museum of The Hague) in The Netherlands exhibits an anonymous painting, depicting Działyński as head of a Polish envoy delegation to the Dutch Republic in July 1597.

References 

Polish nobility
Ambassadors of Poland to England
1560 births
1609 deaths
Działyński